FC Rechitsa-2014 was a Belarusian football club based in Rechytsa.

History
The club was founded in 1952 as Krasnaya Zvezda Rechitsa (Red Star) and spent Soviet years playing in the Belarusian SSR league or in lower regional leagues. In 1960, they became Dneprovets Rechitsa, then Dnepr Rechitsa in 1962. In 1977, they were renamed to Neftyanik Rechitsa (Oiler) and in 1980 to Sputnik Rechitsa (Satellite). In 1991, Sputnik won the Belarusian SSR First League (2nd level).

In 1992, the club was renamed to Vedrich Rechitsa and included to newly created Belarusian Premier League. They played there until 1996, when they finished last and relegated. After three years in the First League, the team returned to the top level and played two more seasons (2000, 2001) and then relegated again. Since 2002, they have been playing in the First League.

In 2004, Vedrich-97 finished as a First League runner-up and was supposed to be promoted to Premier League. However, the club couldn't obtain the license due to insufficient infrastructure and had to stay in the First League.

In 2014, the club was renamed to Rechitsa-2014, and in 2015, they finished last in the First League and were relegated. In early 2016, the club was folded. In 2017, a new club Sputnik Rechitsa was created after DYuSSh-DSK Gomel relocated to the town.

Name changes
1952: founded as Krasnaya Zvezda Rechitsa
1962: renamed to Dneprovets Rechitsa
1962: renamed to Dnepr Rechitsa
1977: renamed to Neftyanik Rechitsa
1980: renamed to Sputnik Rechitsa
1992: renamed to Vedrich Rechitsa
1997: renamed to Vedrich-97 Rechitsa
2014: renamed to Rechitsa-2014

Honours
 Belarusian Cup
 Runners-up (1): 1993

League and cup history

1 Club was unable to obtain Premier League license and had to stay in the First League.

References

External links
 Rechitsa-2014 Official website

Defunct football clubs in Belarus
Gomel Region
1952 establishments in Belarus
Association football clubs established in 1952
2016 disestablishments in Belarus
Association football clubs disestablished in 2016